Tithorea is a Neotropical genus of butterflies belonging to the family Nymphalidae. The genus was erected by Henry Doubleday in 1847.

List of species
 Tithorea harmonia (Cramer, [1777]) – Harmonia tiger or Harmonia tiger-wing
 Tithorea pacifica Willmott & Lamas, 2004
 Tithorea tarricina Hewitson, 1858 – tarricina longwing or cream-spotted tigerwing

References

"Tithorea Doubleday, 1847". BioLib.  Retrieved January 9, 2020.

 
Ithomiini
Nymphalidae of South America
Nymphalidae genera
Taxa named by Henry Doubleday